Byrsia dotata is a moth of the family Erebidae. It was described by Francis Walker in 1865. It is found on Sulawesi, Ambon Island, Batchian, Timor and New Guinea.

Subspecies
Byrsia dotata dotata
Byrsia dotata ornata Rothschild & Jordan, 1901
Byrsia dotata pallidior Rothschild, 1912
Byrsia dotata papuana Rothschild & Jordan, 1901

References

Moths described in 1865
Lithosiini